John Roberts (after 1672 – 4 September 1731) of Llwyn Ynn, Llanfair Dyffryn Clwyd, Denbighshire was a Welsh politician who sat in the House of Commons between 1710 and 1722.

Early life
 Roberts was the eldest son and heir of Hugh Roberts of Hafod-y-Bwch, Denbighshire, and his wife Anne Wynn Jones, daughter of Richard Wynn Jones of Plas Newydd at Llanfair Dyffryn Clwyd.  Hafod was a small estate situated near Chirk Castle but his mother brought Plas Newydd  into the family. He enterered Gray's Inn in 1687. In 1693, he married Susannah Parry, the daughter and later heiress of William Parry of Llwyn Ynn, Denbighshire. By this marriage he acquired Llwyn Ynn, Llanfair Dyffryn Clwyd.

Career
Roberts was appointed High Sheriff of Denbighshire for the year 1705 to 1706. At the  1710 general election,  he was returned unopposed as  Member of Parliament (MP) for Denbigh Boroughs on the Myddleton interest. He was listed as a Tory and 'Worthy patriot'. At the 1713 general election, he was defeated at Denbigh Boroughs in a contest. He regained his seat at Denbigh Boroughs at the 1715 general election. He was a Tory, and in 1719, voted against the repeal of the Occasional Conformity and Schism Acts and against the Peerage Bill. He was found to have been given stock in the South Sea Company in 1720. At the 1722 general election he had to stand aside at Denbigh for a member of the Myddleton family.

Family
Roberts first wife died on 19 January 1722 and he married secondly Jane Morris, the widow of Morris Jones of Llanrhyadr, Denbighshire and daughter of Sir Walter Bagot, 3rd Baronet, MP, of Blithfield, Staffordshire. He died on 4 September 1731. By his first wife, he had 3 sons who predeceased him and a daughter. He left his estates to his daughter.

References

1670s births
1731 deaths
Members of the Parliament of England for Denbighshire
Members of Gray's Inn
British MPs 1710–1713
British MPs 1715–1722
Members of the Parliament of Great Britain for Welsh constituencies
High Sheriffs of Denbighshire